The Răcătău is a left tributary of the river Someșul Rece in Romania. It discharges into the Someșul Rece in Măguri-Răcătău.

References

Rivers of Romania
Rivers of Cluj County